Essex Arms is the fourth studio album by British singer-songwriter Darren Hayman, his third with his regular backing band the Secondary Modern.  It was released by Fortuna Pop! in 2010. It is the second part of his "Essex Trilogy".

Track listing
 "Be Lonely" – 4:05
 "Calling Out Your Name Again" – 4:17 (with Emma-Lee Moss)
 "Two Tree Island" – 7:08
 "Winter Makes You Want Me More" – 4:36
 "Super Kings" – 3:06
 "Cocoa Butter" – 3:24
 "Dagenham Ford" – 4:08
 "I'll Be Your Alibi" – 5:54
 "Spiderman Beats Ironman" – 4:13
 "Drive Too Fast" – 3:35
 "Plastic and Steel" – 2:52
 "Nothing You Can Do About It" – 3:30

2010 albums
Darren Hayman albums
Fortuna Pop! Records albums